Parviturbo granulum is a species of sea snail, a marine gastropod mollusk in the family Skeneidae.

Description
(Original description by W.H. Dall) The size of the shell attains 1 mm in height and breadth. The shell is elevated and compact, having ten or twelve fine strong spiral cinguli, under which are finer radiating raised incremental lines. It is white with a rounded base and a perforate umbilicus, three whorls, a nearly circular aperture, with slightly thickened or expanded margin. For so small a shell it seems remarkably solid and strong.

Distribution
This species occurs in the Caribbean Sea off the Dominican Republic.

References

External links
 To Encyclopedia of Life
 To World Register of Marine Species

granulum
Gastropods described in 1889